Christian Island 30A is a First Nations reserve in Simcoe County, Ontario. It is one of the reserves of the Beausoleil First Nation.  It had a population of 42 in the 2016 Census, up from 36 in the 2011 Census.

References

Anishinaabe reserves in Ontario
Municipalities in Simcoe County